She-Hulk is a Marvel Comics character; the first iteration is the alter ego of Jennifer Walters.

She-Hulk may also refer to:

 Jennifer Walters (Marvel Cinematic Universe), the character as portrayed in the Marvel Cinematic Universe (MCU)
 She-Hulk: Attorney at Law, a MCU Disney+ series featuring the Walters character
 She-Hulk (Lyra), the second character to hold the mantle
 Betty Ross, the third character to hold the mantle

See also
 Shulk, the protagonist of the video game Xenoblade Chronicles
 Hulk (disambiguation)